Winterbach is a municipality in the district of Südwestpfalz , in Rhineland-Palatinate, in western Germany.

It is 12 km northeast of the city of Zweibrucken, and 20 km northwest of the city of Pirmasens.

For a period of time, Sudwestpfalz was part of Bavaria.

References

Südwestpfalz